State Route 230 (SR 230) is a  state highway located in Hancock County in central coastal Maine. Its southern terminus is at State Route 3 in Trenton, and its northern terminus is at U.S. Route 1 and State Route 3 in Ellsworth.  SR 230 serves as a coastal alternate to SR 3 running along the Mount Desert Narrows and Union River. It is signed as a north–south highway, but occupies an L-shaped alignment running west, southwest, then north.

Route description
SR 230 begins at SR 3 in Trenton near Hancock County-Bar Harbor Airport, just north of the bridge approach to Mount Desert Island. The highway proceeds directly west (signed north), running along the north side of Goose Cove. At Goose Cove Road, a bypass of the southernmost part of SR 230, the highway turns south towards Oak Point and the Mount Desert Narrows. The highway runs north along the Union River Bay, which transitions into the river proper as SR 230 crosses into the city of Ellsworth. SR 230 becomes Water Street as it proceeds into the downtown area, then terminates at US 1 / SR 3 (Main Street).

History
The entire length of SR 230 was originally designated as an extension of SR 102 in 1936.  However, in 1946, SR 102 was truncated to its current northern terminus at SR 3 in Bar Harbor.  The remaining stretch of SR 102 was redesignated as SR 230, excluding its former concurrency with SR 3.  The route has not changed since.

Major junctions

See also

References

External links

Floodgap Roadgap's RoadsAroundME: Maine State Route 230

230
Transportation in Hancock County, Maine